Darrel Johnson (born February 21, 1959) is a former college basketball coach.  He was head coach of the Baylor Bears team from 1992 to 1994. He was previously head coach at Oklahoma Baptist University from 1985 to 1990 and at Oklahoma City University from 1990 to 1992. After being fired in a scandal over violation of NCAA rules, he became a scout for the Charlotte Bobcats and basketball coach and director of athletics at The Woodlands Christian Academy. He later became a scout for the New Orleans Pelicans and for the Los Angeles Clippers. Johnson retired from basketball in 2021 and currently resides in Edmond, Oklahoma. 

Johnson attended Putnam City High School in Oklahoma City, Oklahoma. He played professional basketball in Europe for a year and then worked as a high school basketball coach at Putnam City North and Ada, winning the 1982 3A state championship  . From 1982 to 1985 he was an assistant coach at Oklahoma State University. He was head coach at Oklahoma Baptist University from 1985 to 1990.

He was head basketball coach at Oklahoma City University from 1990 to 1992. The team had a 73–3 record and won the NAIA Men's Basketball Championship both years, winning 56 consecutive games while at OCU. He was known for a fast-paced style of play.

Johnson was head coach of men's basketball at Baylor from May 1992 to November 1994, when he was dismissed because of accusations of violations of NCAA regulations in the program.  Johnson was cleared of all charges, but Baylor sued him in November 1995 for damages. That lawsuit was withdrawn in February 1996 after Johnson accepted responsibility for "improprieties" in the program while he was head coach.

Beginning in the early 2000s, Johnson worked for the Charlotte Bobcats as a personnel staffer and scout. In 2005–09 he was head boys' basketball coach at The Woodlands Christian Academy, near Houston, also becoming athletic director in 2007; his record there was 109-16, and the school won the district title all four years and went to the state final four three times, winning the State Title in 2008 and 2009.  After retiring from The Woodlands, he moved to Edmond, Oklahoma.

Head coaching record

References

1955 births
Living people
American men's basketball coaches
Basketball coaches from Oklahoma
Baylor Bears men's basketball coaches
Charlotte Bobcats scouts
College men's basketball head coaches in the United States
Oklahoma Baptist Bison basketball coaches
Oklahoma City Stars men's basketball coaches
Oklahoma State Cowboys basketball coaches
Sportspeople from Oklahoma City